Olga Olegovna Adzhiderskaya (Ольга Аджидерская; born 28 May 1982) is a Kazakhstani handball player. She was born in Kyzylorda. She competed at the 2008 Summer Olympics in Beijing, where the Kazakhstani team placed 10th.

References

External links

1982 births
Living people
People from Kyzylorda
Kazakhstani female handball players
Olympic handball players of Kazakhstan
Handball players at the 2008 Summer Olympics
Asian Games medalists in handball
Handball players at the 2002 Asian Games
Handball players at the 2006 Asian Games
Asian Games silver medalists for Kazakhstan
Medalists at the 2002 Asian Games
Medalists at the 2006 Asian Games
21st-century Kazakhstani women